Torshizuk (also Romanized as Torshīzūk, Torsīzūk, and Torsh Shūk) is a village in Baghestan Rural District, in the Eslamiyeh District of Ferdows County, South Khorasan Province, Iran. At the 2006 census, its population was 84, in 32 families.

References 

Populated places in Ferdows County